Nautilus Award was a Polish science fiction and fantasy award created by Robert J. Szmidt of the Science Fiction magazine. The award is named after the cephalopods of that name (nautilus). 
Each year, five novels and short stories are recognized. The awards have been presented for years 2003-2007 and 2009. The 2008 awards were not given out due to magazine publisher change. Since 2010 the award has been awarded several times, but it has also been mired in controversy and its future status is unknown.

References

External links
 

Awards established in 2003
Polish science fiction awards